A ship channel can be an artificial or dredged navigable channel for ships; see Fairway (navigation). A ship channel can also be a channel formed through surface ice by a ship.

Several waterways are referred to as the Ship Channel
 Calcasieu Ship Channel
 Corpus Christi Ship Channel
 Houston Ship Channel
 Matagorda Ship Channel
 Sacramento Deep Water Ship Channel

See also 
 Sethusamudram Shipping Canal Project
 Stockton Deepwater Shipping Channel